’Arrana is a Palestinian village in the Jenin Governorate, located 4 kilometers Northeast of Jenin, in the northern West Bank. According to the Palestinian Central Bureau of Statistics, the village had a population of 2,144 inhabitants in mid-year 2006.

History
It has been suggested that this was Aaruna in the list of places conquered by  Thutmose III.

Ceramics from the Byzantine era have been found here.

Ottoman era
It had a population of 17 households, all Muslim. They paid a  fixed tax rate of 25 % on agricultural products, including wheat, barley, summer crops,  olive trees, goats and beehives, in addition to  occasional revenues; a total of  9,000 akçe.

In 1838, it was noted as a village in the Jenin district.

In 1870, Victor Guérin noted it on a small hilltop.

In 1882, the PEF's Survey of Western Palestine (SWP) described Arraneh as: "A small village, principally of mud, with a few stone houses, standing in the plain, surrounded by olive-yards. It is supplied with water from cisterns. A kubbeh exists about 1/4 mile north of the village."

British Mandate era
In the 1922 census of Palestine, conducted by the British Mandate authorities, the village had a population of 216 Muslims, increasing slightly in the 1931 census  to 267 Muslims, in 46 households.

In  1944/5 statistics the population was 320, all Muslim, with a total of 7,866 dunams of land, according to an official land and population survey. Of this, 13 dunams were used for  plantations and irrigable land, 6,460 dunams for cereals, while 10 dunams were built-up (urban) land.

Jordanian era
After the 1948 Arab–Israeli War and the 1949 Armistice Agreements, Arranah  came  under Jordanian rule.

The Jordanian census of 1961 found 539 inhabitants.

Post-1967
Since the Six-Day War in 1967, Arranah has been under Israeli occupation.

Footnotes

Bibliography

External links
  Welcome To 'Arrana
 Arrana, Welcome to Palestine
 Survey of Western Palestine, Map 9: IAA, Wikimedia commons

Villages in the West Bank
Jenin Governorate
Municipalities of the State of Palestine